Massimo Di Domenico (born 5 December 1945) is a former professional tennis player from Italy who was active in the 1960s and 1970s.

His best singles result at a Grand Slam tournament was reaching the third round at the French Open in 1969 in which he lost to seventh-seeded Roy Emerson in four sets. At the Australian Open earlier that year he had a bye in the first round and lost to first-seeded Rod Laver in the second round in straight sets. At Wimbledon he took part in the singles qualifying event from 1969 to 1971 but did not make it to the main draw. In doubles he reached the second round at the Australian Open in 1969 and at Wimbledon in 1970 with compatriots Adriano Panatta and  Ezio Di Matteo respectively.

Di Domenico played for the Italian Davis Cup team in 1970 and 1971 and had a 3–3 win–loss record.

References

External links
 
 
 

Italian male tennis players
1945 births
Living people